The discography of British singer Sting. Born Gordon Sumner in 1951, he was a member of the jazz group Last Exit, who released a cassette album in 1975. With The Police (1977-1986, occasional reunions thereafter), Sting sold over 100 million records and singles. As a solo performer, he has released 15 albums between 1985 and 2021, most of which have sold millions of copies worldwide.

Albums

Studio albums

Collaboration albums

Live albums

Compilation albums

Extended plays

Singles

As lead artist

1980s

1990s

2000s

2010s

2020s

As featured artist

Other appearances

Notes

References

External links
Official discography of Sting

Rock music discographies
Discographies of British artists
Folk music discographies
Pop music discographies
Discography